The 2014–15 Golden State Warriors season was the 69th season of the franchise in the National Basketball Association (NBA), and their 53rd in the San Francisco Bay Area.  The Warriors finished the season 67–15, a new franchise record for wins in a season, beating their previous best record of winning 59 games in the 1975–76 season.  They are the tenth NBA team to win 67 games in a season. Golden State reached the 2015 NBA Finals and defeated the Cleveland Cavaliers 4–2, to win their first title in 40 years, and the fourth in franchise history. Their 83 total wins for the season was the third most for a team in NBA history, they went 83–20 combining regular season and playoff games.

Under first-year head coach and former NBA player Steve Kerr, the Warriors began the season 10–2, the best start in franchise history. They went 5–0 on the road in November, their second perfect road trip in franchise history, and first since 1978. Between November 13 and December 14, the Warriors won a franchise record 16 games in a row, improving to 21–2 on the season, before the record was snapped by the Memphis Grizzlies. On January 21, the team established a new franchise record of 17 straight home wins, extending the record to 19 before losing to the Chicago Bulls on January 27. With their win against the Portland Trail Blazers on March 24, they clinched the Pacific Division for the first time since the 1975–76 season, also tying the franchise record for road wins in a season with 24. Golden State finished with a road record of 28–13, and a franchise home win–loss record of 39–2, tied for second all-time best home record. On March 28, the Warriors won their 60th game and clinched the best record in the Western Conference and set a franchise record for regular season wins (the 1975–76 Warriors had won 59). They finished the regular season with a record of 67–15.

Numerous Warriors set individual records over the course of the season. Stephen Curry won the NBA Most Valuable Player Award, the first Warriors player to win since Wilt Chamberlain in the 1959–60 NBA season, when the franchise was still located in Philadelphia. He also broke his own NBA record for made three-pointers in a season of 272, finishing with 286. On January 23, 2015, Klay Thompson broke the NBA record for most points scored in a quarter with 37, finishing the game with a career high 52 points. On April 15, head coach Steve Kerr won his 63rd game with the Warriors and broke the NBA record for most wins by a rookie head coach. Curry and Thompson, dubbed the "Splash Brothers", broke the single-season record for most three-pointers made by a pair of teammates. Both also made the All-Star team, Curry as a starter and Thompson as a reserve. Together, they sank 525 three-pointers over the course of the season, smashing the prior NBA record of 484 (set by themselves in 2013–14).

Draft

The Warriors did not have a pick in the 2014 NBA draft.

Preseason

|- style="background:#cfc;"
| 1
| October 7
| @ L.A. Clippers
| 
| Klay Thompson (20)
| David Lee (9)
| 5 players tied (3)
| Staples Center13,958
| 1–0
|- style="background:#cfc;"
| 2
| October 9
| @ L.A. Lakers
| 
| Klay Thompson (25)
| Andrew Bogut (6)
| Stephen Curry (6)
| Staples Center13,128
| 2–0
|- style="background:#cfc;"
| 3
| October 12
| @ L.A. Lakers
| 
| Stephen Curry (25)
| Andrew Bogut (7)
| Andre Iguodala (8)
| Citizens Business Bank Arena7,842
| 3-0
|- style="background:#cfc;"
| 4
| October 16
| Denver
| 
| James Michael McAdoo (20)
| James Michael McAdoo (7)
| Klay Thompson (5)
| Wells Fargo Arena11,105
| 4–0
|- style="background:#fcc;"
| 5
| October 17
| @ Miami
| 
| Klay Thompson (29)
| David Lee (6)
| Bogut, Curry (7)
| Sprint Center12,783
| 4–1
|- style="background:#fcc;"
| 6
| October 19
| @ Houston
| 
| Justin Holiday (18)
| Aaron Craft (7)
| Nemanja Nedovic (5)
| State Farm Arena5,647
| 4–2
|- style="background:#cfc;"
| 7
| October 21
| L.A. Clippers
| 
| Stephen Curry (27)
| Ognjen Kuzmic (10)
| Curry, Green (6)
| Oracle Arena19,596
| 5-2
|- style="background:#cfc;"
| 8
| October 24
| Denver
| 
| Klay Thompson (35)
| Andrew Bogut (8)
| Stephen Curry (11)
| Oracle Arena19,596
| 6-2

Regular season

Standings

By Division

By Conference

Game log

|- style="background:#cfc;"
| 1
| October 29
| @ Sacramento
| 
| Stephen Curry (24)
| Stephen Curry (10)
| Klay Thompson (6)
| Sleep Train Arena17,317
| 1–0

|- style="background:#cfc;"
| 2
| November 1
| L.A. Lakers
| 
| Klay Thompson (41)
| Andrew Bogut (10)
| Stephen Curry (10)
| Oracle Arena19,596
| 2–0
|- style="background:#cfc;"
| 3
| November 2
| @ Portland
| 
| Klay Thompson (29)
| Andrew Bogut (12)
| Stephen Curry (6)
| Moda Center19,441
| 3–0
|- style="background:#cfc;"
| 4
| November 5
| L.A. Clippers
| 
| Stephen Curry (28)
| Andrew Bogut (14)
| Stephen Curry (7)
| Oracle Arena19,596
| 4–0
|- style="background:#cfc;"
| 5
| November 8
| @ Houston
| 
| Stephen Curry (34)
| Stephen Curry (10)
| Klay Thompson (6)
| Toyota Center18,023
| 5–0
|- style="background:#fcc;"
| 6
| November 9
| @ Phoenix
| 
| Stephen Curry (28)
| Draymond Green (9)
| Stephen Curry (10)
| US Airways Center18,422
| 5–1
|- style="background:#fcc;"
| 7
| November 11
| San Antonio
| 
| Klay Thompson (29)
| Harrison Barnes (8)
| Stephen Curry (5)
| Oracle Arena19,596
| 5–2
|- style="background:#cfc;"
| 8
| November 13
| Brooklyn
| 
| Klay Thompson (25)
| Andrew Bogut (14)
| Draymond Green (7)
| Oracle Arena19,596
| 6–2
|- style="background:#cfc;"
| 9
| November 15
| Charlotte
| 
| Klay Thompson (21)
| Andrew Bogut (9)
| Stephen Curry (9)
| Oracle Arena19,596
| 7–2
|- style="background:#cfc;"
| 10
| November 16
| @ L.A. Lakers
| 
| Stephen Curry (30)
| Andrew Bogut (10)
| Stephen Curry (15)
| STAPLES Center19,060
| 8–2
|- style="background:#cfc;"
| 11
| November 21
| Utah
| 
| Andre Iguodala (17)
| Harrison Barnes (11)
| Stephen Curry (10)
| Oracle Arena19,596
| 9–2
|- style="background:#cfc;"
| 12
| November 23
| @ Oklahoma City
| 
| Marreese Speights (28)
| Draymond Green (9)
| Curry, Green (6)
| Chesapeake Energy Arena18,203
| 10–2
|- style="background:#cfc;"
| 13
| November 25
| @ Miami
| 
| Stephen Curry (40)
| Andrew Bogut (10)
| Stephen Curry (7)
| American Airlines Arena19,647
| 11–2
|- style="background:#cfc;"
| 14
| November 26
| @ Orlando
| 
| Stephen Curry (28)
| Andrew Bogut (12)
| Stephen Curry (8)
| Amway Center17,702
| 12–2
|- style="background:#cfc;"
| 15
| November 28
| @ Charlotte
| 
| Marreese Speights (27)
| Draymond Green (10)
| Stephen Curry (6)
| Time Warner Cable Arena19,381
| 13–2
|- style="background:#cfc;"
| 16
| November 30
| @ Detroit
| 
| Draymond Green (20)
| Marreese Speights (12)
| Stephen Curry (10)
| The Palace of Auburn Hills12,737
| 14–2

|- style="background:#cfc;"
| 17
| December 2
| Orlando
| 
| Stephen Curry (22)
| Bogut, Barnes (12)
| Draymond Green (6)
|Oracle Arena19,596
| 15–2
|- style="background:#cfc;"
| 18
| December 4
| New Orleans
| 
| Klay Thompson (23)
| Draymond Green (14)
| Stephen Curry (11)
| Oracle Arena19,596
| 16–2
|- style="background:#cfc;"
| 19
| December 6
| @ Chicago
| 
| Draymond Green (31)
| Andrew Bogut (12)
| Stephen Curry (7)
| United Center22,353
| 17–2
|- style="background:#cfc;"
| 20
| December 8
| @ Minnesota
| 
| Curry, Thompson (21)
| Draymond Green (10)
| Stephen Curry (7)
| Target Center10,296
| 18–2
|- style="background:#cfc;"
| 21
| December 10
| Houston
| 
| Klay Thompson (21)
| Green, Speights (8)
| Stephen Curry (7)
| Oracle Arena19,596
| 19–2
|- style="background:#cfc;"
| 22
| December 13
| @ Dallas
| 
| Stephen Curry (29)
| Harrison Barnes (9)
| Stephen Curry (8)
| American Airlines Center 20,317
| 20–2
|- style="background:#cfc;"
| 23
| December 14
| @ New Orleans
| 
| Stephen Curry (34)
| Draymond Green (13)
| Stephen Curry (7)
| Smoothie King Center15,037
| 21–2
|- style="background:#fcc;"
| 24
| December 16
| @ Memphis
| 
| Klay Thompson (22)
| Draymond Green (10)
| Curry, Green (6)
| FedExForum18,119
| 21–3
|- style="background:#cfc;"
| 25
| December 18
| Oklahoma City
| 
| Stephen Curry (34)
| Draymond Green (9)
| Curry, Green (9)
| Oracle Arena19,596
| 22–3
|- style="background:#cfc;"
| 26
| December 22
| Sacramento
| 
| Klay Thompson (25)
| Barnes, Green (8)
| Stephen Curry (11)
| Oracle Arena19,596
| 23–3
|- style="background:#fcc;"
| 27
| December 23
| @ L.A. Lakers
| 
| Stephen Curry (22)
| David Lee (7)
| Stephen Curry (6)
| Staples Center19,540
| 23–4
|- style="background:#fcc;"
| 28
| December 25
| @ L.A. Clippers
| 
| Klay Thompson (15)
| Harrison Barnes (13)
| Stephen Curry (7)
| Staples Center19,540
| 23–5
|- style="background:#cfc;"
| 29
| December 27
| Minnesota
| 
| Stephen Curry (25)
| Draymond Green (8)
| Curry, Green (6)
| Oracle Arena19,596
| 24–5
|- style="background:#cfc;"
| 30
| December 30
| Philadelphia
| 
| Marreese Speights (23)
| Draymond Green (10)
| Stephen Curry (9)
| Oracle Arena19,596
| 25–5

|- style="background:#cfc;"
| 31
| January 2
| Toronto
| 
| Stephen Curry (32)
| Draymond Green (11)
| Draymond Green (13)
| Oracle Arena19,596
| 26–5
|- style="background:#cfc;"
| 32
| January 5
| Oklahoma City
| 
| Harrison Barnes (23)
| Draymond Green (13)
| Curry, Iguodala (6)
| Oracle Arena19,596
| 27–5
|- style="background:#cfc;"
| 33
| January 7
| Indiana
| 
| Klay Thompson (40)
| Draymond Green (9)
| Stephen Curry (15)
| Oracle Arena19,596
| 28–5
|- style="background:#cfc;"
| 34
| January 9
| Cleveland
| 
| Klay Thompson (24)
| Draymond Green (11)
| Stephen Curry (10)
| Oracle Arena19,596
| 29–5
|- style="background:#cfc;"
| 35
| January 13
| @ Utah
| 
| Stephen Curry (27)
| Bogut, Lee (8)
| Stephen Curry (11)
| EnergySolutions Arena19,911
| 30–5
|- style="background:#cfc;"
| 36
| January 14
| Miami
| 
| Stephen Curry (32)
| Lee, Speights (6)
| Andre Iguodala (7)
| Oracle Arena19,596
| 31–5
|- style="background:#fcc;"
| 37
| January 16
| @ Oklahoma City
| 
| Klay Thompson (32)
| Draymond Green (9)
| Stephen Curry (6)
| Chesapeake Energy Arena18,203
| 31–6
|- style="background:#cfc;"
| 38
| January 17
| @ Houston
| 
| Curry, Thompson (27)
| David Lee (8)
| Stephen Curry (11)
| Toyota Center18,458
| 32–6
|- style="background:#cfc;"
| 39
| January 19
| Denver
| 
| Klay Thompson (22)
| David Lee (10)
| Stephen Curry (8)
| Oracle Arena19,596
| 33–6
|- style="background:#cfc;"
| 40
| January 21
| Houston
| 
| Klay Thompson (27)
| Bogut, Lee (10)
| Stephen Curry (10)
| Oracle Arena19,596
| 34–6
|- style="background:#cfc;"
| 41
| January 23
| Sacramento
| 
| Klay Thompson (52)
| David Lee (9)
| Stephen Curry (11)
| Oracle Arena19,596
| 35–6
|- style="background:#cfc;"
| 42
| January 25
| Boston
| 
| Klay Thompson (31)
| Andrew Bogut (13)
| Stephen Curry (11)
| Oracle Arena19,596
| 36–6
|- style="background:#fcc;"
| 43
| January 27
| Chicago
| 
| Klay Thompson (30)
| Klay Thompson (10)
| Stephen Curry (9)
| Oracle Arena19,596
| 36–7
|- style="background:#fcc;"
| 44
| January 30
| @ Utah
| 
| Stephen Curry (32)
| Marreese Speights (8)
| Stephen Curry (6)
| EnergySolutions Arena19,295
| 36–8
|- style="background:#cfc;"
| 45
| January 31
| Phoenix
| 
| Stephen Curry (25)
| Draymond Green (11)
| Stephen Curry (7)
| Oracle Arena19,596
| 37–8

|- style="background:#cfc;"
| 46
| February 3
| @ Sacramento
| 
| Stephen Curry (23)
| Marreese Speights (8)
| Stephen Curry (9)
| Sleep Train Arena17,317
| 38–8
|- style="background:#cfc;"
| 47
| February 4
| Dallas
| 
| Stephen Curry (51)
| Draymond Green (10)
| Draymond Green (6)
| Oracle Arena19,596
| 39–8
|- style="background:#fcc;"
| 48
| February 6
| @ Atlanta
| 
| Klay Thompson (29)
| Draymond Green (20)
| Stephen Curry (9)
| Philips Arena19,225
| 39–9
|- style="background:#cfc;"
| 49
| February 7
| @ New York
| 
| Stephen Curry (22)
| Draymond Green (13)
| David Lee (5)
| Madison Square Garden19,812
| 40–9
|- style="background:#cfc;"
| 50
| February 9
| @ Philadelphia
| 
| Stephen Curry (20)
| Andrew Bogut (9)
| Stephen Curry (6)
| Wells Fargo Center16,247
| 41–9
|- style="background:#cfc;"
| 51
| February 11
| @ Minnesota
| 
| Stephen Curry (25)
| Draymond Green (13)
| Stephen Curry (8)
| Target Center14,303
| 42–9
|- align="center"
|colspan="9" bgcolor="#bbcaff"|All-Star Break
|- style="background:#cfc;"
| 52
| February 20
| San Antonio
| 
| Stephen Curry (25)
| 3 players tied (6)
| Stephen Curry (11)
| Oracle Arena19,596
| 43–9
|- style="background:#fcc;"
| 53
| February 22
| @ Indiana
| 
| Klay Thompson (39)
| David Lee (12)
| Bogut, Iguodala (4)
| Bankers Life Fieldhouse17,789
| 43–10
|- style="background:#cfc;"
| 54
| February 24
| @ Washington
| 
| Stephen Curry (32)
| David Lee (10)
| Stephen Curry (8)
| Verizon Center20,356
| 44–10
|- style="background:#fcc;"
| 55
| February 26
| @ Cleveland
| 
| David Lee (19)
| Draymond Green (8)
| Stephen Curry (6)
| Quicken Loans Arena20,562
| 44–11
|- style="background:#cfc;"
| 56
| February 27
| @ Toronto
| 
| Klay Thompson (25)
| Draymond Green (9)
| Shaun Livingston (8)
| Air Canada Centre19,800
| 45–11

|- style="background:#cfc;"
| 57
| March 1
| @ Boston
| 
| Stephen Curry (37)
| Draymond Green (11)
| Stephen Curry (5)
| TD Garden18,624
| 46–11
|- style="background:#fcc;"
| 58
| March 2
| @ Brooklyn
| 
| Stephen Curry (26)
| Draymond Green (11)
| Stephen Curry (7)
| Barclays Center17,732
| 46–12
|- style="background:#cfc;"
| 59
| March 4
| Milwaukee
| 
| Draymond Green (23)
| Draymond Green (12)
| Stephen Curry (11)
| Oracle Arena19,596
| 47–12
|- style="background:#cfc;"
| 60
| March 6
| Dallas
| 
| Stephen Curry (22)
| Andrew Bogut (13)
| Stephen Curry (7)
| Oracle Arena19,596
| 48–12
|- style="background:#cfc;"
| 61
| March 8
| L.A. Clippers
| 
| Draymond Green (23)
| Barnes, Livingston (8)
| Draymond Green (6)
| Oracle Arena19,596
| 49–12
|- style="background:#cfc;"
| 62
| March 9
| @ Phoenix
| 
| Stephen Curry (36)
| Draymond Green (10)
| Stephen Curry (5)
| US Airways Center18,055
| 50–12
|- style="background:#cfc;"
| 63
| March 11
| Detroit
| 
| Klay Thompson (27)
| Green, Iguodala (7)
| Stephen Curry (11)
| Oracle Arena19,596
| 51–12
|- style="background:#fcc;"
| 64
| March 13
| @ Denver
| 
| Justin Holiday (23)
| 3 players tied (6)
| Shaun Livingston (8)
| Pepsi Center19,155
| 51–13
|- style="background:#cfc;"
| 65
| March 14
| New York
| 
| Klay Thompson (27)
| Draymond Green (7)
| Stephen Curry (11)
| Oracle Arena19,596
| 52–13
|- style="background:#cfc;"
| 66
| March 16
| L.A. Lakers
| 
| Klay Thompson (26)
| Draymond Green (8)
| Stephen Curry (9)
| Oracle Arena19,596
| 53–13
|- style="background:#cfc;"
| 67
| March 18
| Atlanta
| 
| Harrison Barnes (25)
| Andrew Bogut (14)
| Stephen Curry (12)
| Oracle Arena19,596
| 54–13
|- style="background:#cfc;"
| 68
| March 20
| New Orleans
| 
| Harrison Barnes (22)
| Draymond Green (8)
| Stephen Curry (11)
| Oracle Arena19,596
| 55–13
|- style="background:#cfc;"
| 69
| March 21
| Utah
| 
| Stephen Curry (24)
| Andrew Bogut (8)
| Draymond Green (7)
| Oracle Arena19,596
| 56–13
|- style="background:#cfc;"
| 70
| March 23
| Washington
| 
| Stephen Curry (24)
| Andrew Bogut (12)
| Stephen Curry (6)
| Oracle Arena19,596
| 57–13
|- style="background:#cfc;"
| 71
| March 24
| @ Portland
| 
| Stephen Curry (33)
| Andrew Bogut (16)
| Stephen Curry (10)
| Moda Center19,985
| 58–13
|- style="background:#cfc;"
| 72
| March 27
| @ Memphis
| 
| Stephen Curry (38)
| Bogut, Ezeli (8)
| Stephen Curry (10)
| FedExForum18,119
| 59–13
|- style="background:#cfc;"
| 73
| March 28
| @ Milwaukee
| 
| Stephen Curry (25)
| Marreese Speights (7)
| Shaun Livingston (8)
| BMO Harris Bradley Center18,717
| 60–13
|- style="background:#cfc;"
| 74
| March 31
| @ L.A. Clippers
| 
| Stephen Curry (27)
| Andrew Bogut (9)
| Andre Iguodala (7)
| Staples Center19,601
| 61–13

|- style="background:#cfc;"
| 75
| April 2
| Phoenix
| 
| Stephen Curry (28)
| Andrew Bogut (9)
| Klay Thompson (6)
| Oracle Arena19,596
| 62–13
|- style="background:#cfc;"
| 76
| April 4
| @ Dallas
| 
| Klay Thompson (21)
| Andrew Bogut (11)
| Shaun Livingston (5)
| American Airlines Center20,407
| 63–13
|- style="background:#fcc;"
| 77
| April 5
| @ San Antonio
| 
| Stephen Curry (24)
| Bogut, Green (7)
| Curry, Green (6)
| AT&T Center18,581
| 63–14
|- style="background:#fcc;"
| 78
| April 7
| @ New Orleans
| 
| Stephen Curry (25)
| Draymond Green (14)
| Stephen Curry (9)
| Smoothie King Center18,097
| 63–15
|- style="background:#cfc;"
| 79
| April 9
| Portland
| 
| Stephen Curry (45)
| Draymond Green (14)
| Stephen Curry (10)
| Oracle Arena19,596
| 64–15
|- style="background:#cfc;"
| 80
| April 11
| Minnesota
| 
| Stephen Curry (34)
| Draymond Green (14)
| Stephen Curry (7)
| Oracle Arena19,596
| 65–15
|- style="background:#cfc;"
| 81
| April 13
| Memphis
| 
| Klay Thompson (42)
| Draymond Green (9)
| Stephen Curry (8)
| Oracle Arena19,596
| 66–15
|- style="background:#cfc;"
| 82
| April 15
| Denver
| 
| Klay Thompson (25)
| Marreese Speights (8)
| Stephen Curry (7)
| Oracle Arena19,596
| 67–15

Playoffs

Game log

|- style="background:#bfb;"
| 1
| April 18
| New Orleans
| 
| Stephen Curry (34)
| Andrew Bogut (14)
| Draymond Green (7)
| Oracle Arena19,596
| 1–0
|- style="background:#bfb;"
| 2
| April 20
| New Orleans
| 
| Klay Thompson (26)
| Andrew Bogut (14)
| Stephen Curry (6)
| Oracle Arena19,596
| 2–0
|- style="background:#bfb;"
| 3
| April 23
| @ New Orleans
| 
| Stephen Curry (40)
| Draymond Green (17)
| Stephen Curry (9)
| Smoothie King Center18,444
| 3–0
|- style="background:#bfb;"
| 4
| April 25
| @ New Orleans
| 
| Stephen Curry (39)
| Draymond Green (10)
| Stephen Curry (9)
| Smoothie King Center18,443
| 4–0

|- style="background:#bfb;"
| 1
| May 3
| Memphis
| 
| Stephen Curry (22)
| Andrew Bogut (7)
| Stephen Curry (7)
| Oracle Arena19,596
| 1–0
|- style="background:#fbb;"
| 2
| May 5
| Memphis
| 
| Stephen Curry (19)
| Bogut, Green (12)
| Stephen Curry (6)
| Oracle Arena19,596
| 1–1
|- style="background:#fbb;"
| 3
| May 9
| @ Memphis
| 
| Stephen Curry (22)
| Bogut, Thompson (8)
| Stephen Curry (6)
| FedEx Forum18,119
| 1–2
|- style="background:#bfb;"
| 4
| May 11
| @ Memphis
| 
| Stephen Curry (33)
| Draymond Green (10)
| Stephen Curry (5)
| FedEx Forum18,119
| 2–2
|- style="background:#bfb;"
| 5
| May 13
| Memphis
| 
| Klay Thompson (21)
| Andrew Bogut (9)
| Draymond Green (9)
| Oracle Arena19,596
| 3–2
|- style="background:#bfb;"
| 6
| May 15
| @ Memphis
| 
| Stephen Curry (32)
| Draymond Green (12)
| Stephen Curry (11)
| FedEx Forum18,119
| 4–2

|- style="background:#bfb;"
| 1
| May 19
| Houston
| 
| Stephen Curry (34)
| Draymond Green (12)
| Draymond Green (8)
| Oracle Arena19,596
| 1–0
|- style="background:#bfb;"
| 2
| May 21
| Houston
| 
| Stephen Curry (33)
| Bogut, Green (8)
| Draymond Green (7)
| Oracle Arena19,596
| 2–0
|- style="background:#bfb;"
| 3
| May 23
| @ Houston
| 
| Stephen Curry (40)
| Draymond Green (13)
| Stephen Curry (7)
| Toyota Center18,282
| 3–0
|- style="background:#fbb;"
| 4
| May 25
| @ Houston
| 
| Klay Thompson (24)
| Draymond Green (15)
| 3 players tied (4)
| Toyota Center18,239
| 3–1
|- style="background:#bfb;"
| 5
| May 27
| Houston
| 
| Stephen Curry (26)
| Andrew Bogut (14)
| Curry, Iguodala (6)
| Oracle Arena19,596
| 4–1

|- style="background:#bfb;"
| 1
| June 4
| Cleveland
| 
| Stephen Curry (26)
| Andrew Bogut (7)
| Stephen Curry (8)
| Oracle Arena19,596
| 1–0
|- style="background:#fbb;"
| 2
| June 7
| Cleveland
| 
| Klay Thompson (34)
| Andrew Bogut (10)
| Stephen Curry (5)
| Oracle Arena19,596
| 1–1
|- style="background:#fbb;"
| 3
| June 9
| @ Cleveland
| 
| Stephen Curry (27)
| Ezeli, Green (7)
| Stephen Curry (6)
| Quicken Loans Arena20,562
| 1–2
|- style="background:#bfb;"
| 4
| June 11
| @ Cleveland
| 
| Curry, Iguodala (22)
| 3 players tied (8)
| Curry, Green (6)
| Quicken Loans Arena20,562
| 2–2
|- style="background:#bfb;"
| 5
| June 14
| Cleveland
| 
| Stephen Curry (37)
| Harrison Barnes (10)
| Andre Iguodala (7)
| Oracle Arena19,596
| 3–2
|- style="background:#bfb;"
| 6
| June 16
| @ Cleveland
| 
| Curry, Iguodala (25)
| Draymond Green (11)
| Draymond Green (10)
| Quicken Loans Arena20,562
| 4–2

Player statistics

Regular season

|
| 80 || 80 || 32.7 || .487 || .443 || .914 || 4.3 || 7.7 || 2.0 || 0.2 || 23.8
|-
|
| 77 || 77 || 31.9 || .463 || .437 || .879 || 3.2 || 2.9 || 1.1 || 0.8 || 21.7
|-
|
| 79 || 79 || 31.5 || .443 || .337 || .660 || 8.2 || 3.7 || 1.6 || 1.3 || 11.7
|-
|
| 82 || 82 || 28.3 || .482 || .408 || .720 || 5.5 || 1.4 || 0.7 || 0.2 || 10.1
|-
|
| 77 || 0 || 26.9 || .466 || .349 || .596 || 3.3 || 3.0 || 1.2 || 0.3 || 7.8
|-
|
| 67 || 65 || 23.6 || .563 || .000 || .524 || 8.1 || 2.7 || 0.6 || 1.7 || 6.3
|-
|
| 78 || 2 || 18.8 || .500 || .000 || .714 || 2.2 || 3.3 || 0.6 || 0.3 || 5.9
|-
|
| 49 || 4 || 18.4 || .511 || .000 || .654 || 5.2 || 1.7 || 0.6 || 0.5 || 7.9
|-
|
| 76 || 9 || 15.9 || .492 || .278 || .843 || 4.3 || 0.9 || 0.3 || 0.4 || 10.4
|-
|
| 66 || 1 || 14.9 ||.474 || .384 || .784 || 1.4 || 1.5 || 0.6 || 0.1 || 7.1
|-
|
| 59 || 4 || 11.1 || .387 || .321 || .822 || 1.2 || 0.8 || 0.7 || 0.2 || 4.3
|-
|
| 46 || 7 || 11.0 || .547 || .000 || .628 || 3.4 || 0.2 || 0.2 || 0.9 || 4.4
|-
|
| 15 || 0 || 9.1 || .545 || .000 || .560 || 2.5 || 0.1 || 0.3 || 0.6 || 4.1
|-
|
| 33 || 0 || 8.2 || .204 || .111 || .455 || 1.2 || 0.4 || 0.2 || 0.4 || 0.9
|-
|
| 16 || 0 || 4.5 || .667 || .000 || 1.000 || 1.1 || 0.4 || 0.1 || 0.1 || 1.3
|-
|}

Roster

Transactions

Free agency

Re-signed

Additions

Subtractions

Awards

References

Golden State Warriors seasons
Golden State Warriors
Western Conference (NBA) championship seasons
NBA championship seasons
Golden State Warriors
Golden State Warriors